John Hedley Chapman (16 December 1879 – 14 March 1931) was an Australian politician. Born in Jamestown, South Australia, he was educated at Prince Alfred College in Adelaide before becoming a bank clerk, and a farmer at Port Lincoln. In 1918, he was elected to the South Australian House of Assembly as the Farmers and Settlers (later Country Party) member for Flinders, serving until 1924. In 1925, he was elected to the Australian Senate as a Country Party Senator for South Australia. He died in 1931; Labor's Harry Kneebone was appointed to replace him.

References

 

National Party of Australia members of the Parliament of Australia
Members of the Australian Senate for South Australia
Members of the Australian Senate
Members of the South Australian House of Assembly
1879 births
1931 deaths
National Party of Australia members of the Parliament of South Australia
20th-century Australian politicians